Henry Windsor may refer to:

Prince Henry, Duke of Gloucester (1900–1974), third son of George V and Queen Mary
Prince Harry, Duke of Sussex (born 1984; formally Prince Henry of Wales), younger son of Charles III
Henry Haven Windsor (1859–1924), founder and editor of Popular Mechanics
Henry Thomas Windsor (1796–1848), American Colonial Continental Revolutionary
Henry Windsor Villiers-Stuart (1827–1895), British soldier
Henry Windsor, 5th Baron Windsor (1562–1605), see Baron Windsor

See also
 Harry Windsor (disambiguation)